James Britton (27 May 1920 – December 1980) was an English professional footballer who played as a left half for Bradford (Park Avenue) and Rochdale.

References

1920 births
1980 deaths
Sportspeople from Lancaster, Lancashire
English footballers
Association football midfielders
Lowestoft Town F.C. players
Bradford (Park Avenue) A.F.C. players
Rochdale A.F.C. players
Mossley A.F.C. players
English Football League players